The 2016 New Zealand Derby was a horse race , which took place at Ellerslie Racecourse on Saturday 5 March 2016. It was the 141st running of the New Zealand Derby, and it was won by Rangipo.

In what was widely considered to be an unusually even Derby field, Rangipo brought strong form into the race with wins in the Great Northern Guineas, Waikato Guineas and Avondale Guineas. Being a son of speedy Australian stallion Stryker, the main question mark hanging over his credentials was his stamina for the 2400-metre test.

But after sitting midfield behind a solid early pace, Rangipo moved into contention in the home straight and held on strongly to beat the fast-finishing What's The Story by a short head. The winner's stablemate Raghu was third, ahead of fillies Capella and Valley Girl who came with big late finishes from well back in the field.

It was the first New Zealand Derby win for trainer Tony Pike and a sixth for jockey Vinnie Colgan.

Race details
 Sponsor: BMW
 Prize money: NZ$750,000
 Track: Dead
 Number of runners: 18
 Winner's time: 2:28.89

Full result

Winner's details
Further details of the winner, Rangipo:

 Foaled: 10 August 2012 in Australia
 Sire: Stryker; Dam: Holloway (by Zabeel)
 Owner: John & Margaret Thompson
 Trainer: Tony Pike
 Breeder: John Thompson
 Starts: 12
 Wins: 7
 Seconds: 0
 Thirds: 1
 Earnings: $684,570

The road to the Derby
Early-season appearances in 2015-16 prior to running in the Derby.

 Rangipo - 1st Great Northern Guineas, 1st Waikato Guineas, 1st Avondale Guineas, 3rd Levin Classic
 What's The Story - 6th Trevor Eagle Memorial, 7th Great Northern Guineas
 Raghu - 1st Karaka Mile, 2nd Waikato Guineas, 3rd Avondale Guineas
 Capella - 1st Eight Carat Classic, 3rd Sir Tristram Fillies' Classic
 Valley Girl - 1st Herbie Dyke Stakes, 3rd Eight Carat Classic, 5th Royal Stakes
 Tavago - 1st Wellington Stakes, 3rd Karaka Mile, 13th Waikato Guineas
 Predator - 7th Avondale Guineas
 Get That Jive - 2nd Great Northern Guineas, 3rd Waikato Guineas, 3rd Avondale Guineas
 The Hassler - 5th Avondale Guineas
 Brighton - 2nd Avondale Guineas, 4th New Zealand 2000 Guineas, 6th Karaka Mile, 8th Great Northern Guineas
 Splendido - 2nd BMW Salver, 6th Zabeel Classic
 Thunder Down Under - 1st BMW Salver, 3rd Bonecrusher Stakes, 5th Karaka Mile, 7th Trevor Eagle Memorial, 9th Waikato Guineas, 10th Zabeel Classic, 11th Avondale Guineas
 Son Of Maher - 1st Dunedin Guineas, 2nd Levin Classic, 6th New Zealand 2000 Guineas, 9th Avondale Guineas

Subsequent Group 1 wins
Subsequent wins at Group 1 level by runners in the 2016 New Zealand Derby.

 Tavago - Australian Derby
 Humidor - Australian Cup, Makybe Diva Stakes

See also

 2019 New Zealand Derby
 2018 New Zealand Derby
 2017 New Zealand Derby
 2015 New Zealand Derby
 2014 New Zealand Derby
 2013 New Zealand Derby
 2012 New Zealand Derby
 2011 New Zealand Derby
 2010 New Zealand Derby
  Recent winners of major NZ 3 year old races
 Desert Gold Stakes
 Hawke's Bay Guineas
 Karaka Million
 Levin Classic
 New Zealand 1000 Guineas
 New Zealand 2000 Guineas
 New Zealand Oaks

References

New Zealand Derby
2016 in New Zealand sport
New Zealand Derby
March 2016 sports events in New Zealand